Quentalia is a genus of moths of the family Bombycidae first described by William Schaus in 1929. It has at times been placed in the family Apatelodidae, but recent research indicates the subfamily Epiinae, to which Quentalia belongs, is affiliated with Bombycidae.

Species

Quentalia altura Schaus, 1920
Quentalia amisena Druce, 1890
Quentalia brunnea Dognin, 1916
Quentalia callinicia Schaus, 1929
Quentalia cameloi Schaus, 1939
Quentalia caulea Schaus, 1929
Quentalia chromana Schaus, 1929
Quentalia coarya Schaus, 1929
Quentalia crenulosa (Dyar, 1918)
Quentalia demerida Schaus, 1920
Quentalia denticulata Schaus, 1912
Quentalia dolorosa E. D. Jones, 1908
Quentalia drepanoides (Walker, 1866)
Quentalia eulerufa Schaus
Quentalia excisa Maassen, 1890
Quentalia ficus Herrich-Schäffer, 1856
Quentalia granisca Schaus, 1920
Quentalia incurvata Dognin, 1922
Quentalia intranea Dognin, 1914
Quentalia lapana Schaus, 1920
Quentalia lapanensis Schaus, 1929
Quentalia lividia (Druce, 1887)
Quentalia macerina Schaus, 1929
Quentalia maevia Druce, 1898
Quentalia medinara Schaus, 1929
Quentalia melchthala Schaus, 1929
Quentalia minasa Schaus, 1929
Quentalia moratina Schaus, 1929
Quentalia napima Schaus, 1929
Quentalia numalia Schaus, 1929
Quentalia oaxacana Schaus, 1900
Quentalia ojeda Dognin, 1889
Quentalia orizava Schaus, 1900
Quentalia pallida Maassen, 1890
Quentalia pamina Schaus, 1900
Quentalia paminella Dognin, 1922
Quentalia punctilinea Dognin, 1922
Quentalia purulhana Schaus, 1920
Quentalia ragna Schaus, 1929
Quentalia reissi Maassen, 1890
Quentalia roseilinea Schaus, 1906
Quentalia secatina Schaus, 1929
Quentalia sheila Schaus, 1929
Quentalia subrubicunda Dognin, 1922
Quentalia subumbrata Dognin, 1922
Quentalia tolima Dognin, 1922
Quentalia tremulans Schaus, 1920
Quentalia veca (Druce, 1887)
Quentalia viridans Dognin, 1922
Quentalia vittata (Walker, 1855)

References

Bombycidae